Dutchtown High School is a 5A school that was completed in 2003 in Geismar, an unincorporated area of Ascension Parish located in the U.S. state of Louisiana. It is within the Ascension Parish School Board. Dutchtown Middle School, Bluff Middle School and Prairieville Middle School feed into Dutchtown High. The architecture is based on that of the old Dutchtown High, which was situated across the highway at the current Dutchtown Middle School.

According to the Louisiana School Performance Scores/Letter Grades released by the Louisiana Department of Education, Dutchtown High School is an "A" school and is the #1 high-performing open-enrollment public high school in the state of Louisiana.

In 2017, Dutchtown High School was named a 2017 World-Leading Learner and invited to join the Global Learning Network (GLN), a community of educators from schools that develop, practice, and share innovative approaches to education.

Administration 
Dutchtown High is led by Matthew Monceaux (Principal), Randal Loving (Associate Principal), Ronald Brown (Assistant Principal), Courtney Mancuso (Assistant Principal), Rochelle Page (Assistant Principal), and Barry Whittington (Assistant Principal)

Academics

Dutchtown High School is a comprehensive public senior high school. DTHS has an Honors program and an Advanced Placement program. The school offers 21 Advanced Placement Courses.

Dual Enrollment and Early Start 
In an effort to assist students earn college hours while enrolled in high school, Dutchtown High School offers classes through Southeastern University to seniors who are eligible to enroll in the courses. These courses are presented at Dutchtown in partnership with Southeastern faculty. Additionally, Dutchtown partners with Louisiana State University's Dual Enrollment program to offer a Chemistry credit.

Freshman Academy

The Freshman Academy at Dutchtown High School is divided into four teams - black, white, silver, and purple - and students are placed on a team that consists of the same english, math,  science, and social studies teachers. Each week, each team selects a Student of the Week.

On December 18, 2017, Dutchtown High opened a $12.8 million official Freshman Academy, which will serve over 600 freshmen.

Allied health

Career Pathways
Emergency Health Care
Health Professionals
Nursing	
Nutrition & Food	
Sports Medicine	
Pharmacy

Letterman's Jacket and Graduation CordsThe Allied Health Center students who have been active and remained in good standing in the program for three (3) consecutive years may purchase an academic letterman's jacket.  Patches and caduceus inserts will be provided for senior level students. Students who have been active and remained in good standing in the program for three (3) consecutive years will be rewarded with a graduation cord to be worn during graduation ceremonies.

Internships and Clinicals
Internship, Certified Nurse Assistant, EMT Basic, and Pharmacy Tech are courses designed to give students a chance to watch and possibly experience firsthand some of the daily activities of a medical professional, and possibly attain certification.  These courses are taken during the student's senior year.  While in these programs, students are expected to exhibit professionalism and should treat their work site experiences like a job.  Entrance into these programs is competitive.

Clubs and organizations

4H
Band 
Choir 
Chess/ Game Club 
Colorguard
Dungeons and Dragons
DECA
FBLA
FCCLA
Fellowship of Christian Athletes (FCA) 
Foreign Language Club 
Gallant Griffins 
Griffin Girls 
Griffins Rubik's Cube club
GSA
Homecoming 
Interact Club
Jazz Band 
Junior Class
JV Cheerleaders 
Mentoring 
Mu Alpha Theta
National Art Honor Society 
National Honor Society 
Newspaper 
NJROTC 
PBIS
Quiz Bowl
Scholarship Club   	
Senior Class 
Skills USA 
Speech and Debate
Spoken Word/Poetry Club 
Sports Medicine
Thespian Society 
Varsity Cheerleaders
Yearbook
Youth Government Club

Athletics
Dutchtown High athletics competes in the LHSAA.

Sports offered:

cross country
volleyball
football
swimming
wrestling
boys' basketball
girls' basketball
boys' soccer
girls' soccer
tennis
gymnastics
golf
track & field
softball
baseball
bowling

Instrumental music program

Dutchtown's marching and concert bands are directed by Ms. Sheily Bell, who has been teaching music for 37 years and has been awarded with Louisiana Bandmaster of the Year as well as the John Philip Sousa's Legion of Honor Award, presented to only 20 directors around the world. Ms. Bell is assisted by Mr. Daniel Modenbach and Ms. Abigail Lambert. Dutchtown's marching band competes in a variety of competitions, including the Louisiana Showcase of Marching Bands. Dutchtown placed 6th at Showcase in 2017 and 2019. Dutchtown also hosts their own competition every fall and features dozens of bands from all over the state of Louisiana. In concert season, Dutchtown places numerous students into LMEA's all state concert  and also host an annual Christmas concert.

Notable alumni
 Eddie Lacy (Class of 2009), former University of Alabama running back and former running back for the Green Bay Packers and Seattle Seahawks of the National Football League (NFL); 2013 NFL Offensive Rookie of the Year; Pro Bowl (2013)
 Eric Reid (Class of 2010), former Louisiana State University safety and former safety for the San Francisco 49ers and the Carolina Panthers of the National Football League (NFL); Pro Bowl (2013)
 Landon Collins (Class of  2012), former University of Alabama safety and current safety for the Washington Redskins of the National Football League (NFL); 3× Pro Bowl (2016–2018), First-team All-Pro (2016)
 Justin Reid (Class of  2015), former Stanford University safety and current safety for the Houston Texans of the National Football League (NFL)
Lloyd Cushenberry (Class of 2016), former Louisiana State University center and current center for the Denver Broncos of the National Football League (NFL).

References

External links
Dutchtown High School on APSB website
Dutchtown High School on edline.net website
Ascension Parish School Board

Public high schools in Louisiana
Schools in Ascension Parish, Louisiana
Educational institutions established in 2003
2003 establishments in Louisiana